Lucas Bell Kohl (born May 4, 1998) is a Brazilian racing driver.

Racing record

Career summary

Motorsports career results

American open–wheel racing results

U.S. F2000 National Championship

Indy Lights

Stock Light/Stock Series

References

External links
 
 

1998 births
Living people
People from Santa Cruz do Sul
Brazilian people of German descent
Brazilian racing drivers
U.S. F2000 National Championship drivers
Indy Lights drivers
Sportspeople from Rio Grande do Sul

Formula 4 drivers
Belardi Auto Racing drivers
21st-century Brazilian people